Harbaoui is a surname. Notable people with the surname include:

Hamdi Harbaoui (born 1985), Tunisian footballer
Hassen Harbaoui (born 1987), Tunisian footballer